Ccotancaire is a populated place in Apurímac Region, Peru.

See also
Chuquibambilla
Tambobamba

References

Populated places in the Apurímac Region